Bagieniec  is a village in the urban-rural Gmina Jaworzyna Śląska, within Świdnica County, Lower Silesian Voivodeship, in south-western Poland.

Notable residents
 Ilse von Bredow (1922 - 2014), German author

References

Villages in Świdnica County